Of Cabbages and Kings is the eponymously titled EP by Of Cabbages and Kings, released by Purge/Sound League on 1987.

Track listing

Personnel 
Adapted from the Of Cabbages and Kings liner notes.

Of Cabbages and Kings
 Algis Kizys – vocals, bass guitar, production, design
 Carolyn Master – guitar, keyboards (A1), vocals (A3), lap steel guitar (B), production, design
 Ted Parsons – drums, vocals (A3, B)
Additional musicians
 John Erskine – vocals (B)
 Frank Settembrini – bass guitar (A2)

Technical personnel
 Eleanor Kostyk – illustrations
 Wharton Tiers – production, engineering

Release history

References 

1987 EPs
Of Cabbages and Kings albums
Albums produced by Wharton Tiers